Taylor Peay (born September 5, 1991) is an American soccer player.

Career

College and amateur
Peay spent his entire collegiate career at the University of Washington.  On September 18, 2010, Peay scored his first collegiate goal for the Huskies in a 4–1 upset win over No. 15 Portland. He was one of two freshmen to appear in all 17 matches for the Huskies.  In his sophomore year, Peay made 17 appearances and helped the Huskies record nine clean sheets.  In 2012, he made 20 appearances and finished the year with one goal.  In his final season with the Huskies, Peay made 22 appearances and scored six goals including a hat trick in a 4–1 victory over Santa Clara on September 3. He led the Huskies to their first Pac-12 title since 2000 scoring 9 goals and their first trip to the Elite Eight where they fell to no. 7 seed New Mexico.  On September 13, 2013, Peay was named NSCAA First Team All-American. As well as a Mac Herman Trophy Finalist.

Peay also played in the USL Premier Development League with Ogden Outlaws, Seattle Sounders FC U-23 and North Sound SeaWolves.

Professional
On January 16, 2014, Peay was drafted in the first round of the 2014 MLS SuperDraft by the Portland Timbers.  Later that year, he was loaned out to USL Pro club Orange County Blues FC.  He made his professional debut on April 5 in 2–0 loss to Oklahoma City Energy FC. Peay went on to play a vital part in the 2015 MLS Cup run for the Portland Timbers. Peay then went abroad to Bodo Glimt where he spent a couple months after leaving Portland Timbers at the end of 2016.

Peay then signed with United Soccer League side Real Monarchs on March 23, 2017. Peay's option was not picked by the Monarchs at the end of the 2017 season as he was set to sign with Real Salt Lake.

On December 15, 2017, Peay signed for Real Salt Lake after they acquired his rights from Portland Timbers in exchange for a third round 2018 MLS SuperDraft pick.

On December 11, 2018, Peay signed for USL Championship side Louisville City ahead of their 2019 season.

On December 6, 2019, it was announced Peay would return to Real Monarchs for the 2020 season. His option was declined by Real Monarchs following the 2020 season as he was set to retire from professional soccer.

Honors

Club
Portland Timbers
Real Salt Lake
MLS Cup: 2015
Western Conference (playoffs): 2015
USL Eastern Conference Champion (Louisville City)
USL Cup Finalist (Louisville City)

References

External links

Washington Huskies bio

1991 births
Living people
All-American men's college soccer players
American soccer players
Association football defenders
Louisville City FC players
Major League Soccer players
Ogden Outlaws players
Orange County SC players
Portland Timbers draft picks
Portland Timbers players
Portland Timbers 2 players
Puget Sound Gunners FC players
Real Monarchs players
Real Salt Lake players
Seattle Sounders FC U-23 players
Soccer players from Salt Lake City
USL Championship players
USL League Two players
Washington Huskies men's soccer players